Dukhan is ritual bodily practice known in which the body is smoked with a special (scented) species wood. The ritual is mainly practiced by married women and women preparing for marriage in northern Sudanese provinces., although men also conduct it occasionally to treat rheumatic pain. Yet the practice of Dukhan is not performed amongst men frequently. In fact the Northern Sudanese culture frowns upon the practice amongst men. The technique is considered a traditional medicinal technique in Southern Sudan 

The practice of taking a dukhan has many purported health benefits  such as smoothing the skin, and narrowing of the vagina with women (the latter being useful after childbirth) It also gives the skin a pleasant scent (due to the wood species used, usually shaff and talh wood. Dukhan is said to also be useful for treating syphilis, gonorrhoea and rheumatic pain. In this circumstance, various medicinal plants (such as tundub, natron) are used instead. Dukhan is often followed by dilka (scented massage).

The ritual goes as follows: a woman is anointed with karkar (scented oil) and takes place naked (only covered with a shamla -which is a thick local woolen blanket-) on a seat with a hole in the center. Below this seat, a fire is lit in a pit and scented wood is placed on it, producing smoke. She remains seated until the heat becomes unbearable.

References

See also
 Smoking (cooking)

Traditional medicine